"Chasing Rainbows" is a song by Britpop band Shed Seven. It was released in November 1996 as the first single from their third studio album, Let It Ride, over a year before the album was released in June 1998. The homesickness-inspired song was written by band members Paul Banks and Rick Witter while on tour promoting their previous album, A Maximum High, and it was produced by Chris Sheldon.

The song was released on 4 November 1996 and debuted at number 17 on the UK Singles Chart on 17 November, becoming the band's ninth consecutive top-forty hit in the UK. On 3 July 2020, "Chasing Rainbows" received a Silver certification from the British Phonographic Industry (BPI), denoting sales and streams exceeding 200,000.

Background and release
"Chasing Rainbows" was written while Shed Seven were in Germany promoting their prior album, A Maximum High. Rick Witter said in an interview with Songwriting Magazine that they wrote the song during a murky afternoon while waiting to do their soundcheck. He was sitting in the band's tour bus with bandmate Paul Banks when Banks began composing the main riff on his guitar, then they wrote the lyric quickly afterwards, inspired by their homesickness resulting from constant travel. The two then took the song into soundcheck and received positive feedback, allowing them to record and release the song. Issued on 4 November 1996, "Chasing Rainbows" peaked at number 17 on the UK Singles Chart later the same month. Witter believed that if the song had been released on another week, it would have reached number one.

Track listings
UK 7-inch, CD, and cassette single
 "Chasing Rainbows"
 "In Command"
 "The Skin I'm In"

German CD single
 "Chasing Rainbows"
 "In Command"

Charts

Certifications

References

1996 singles
1996 songs
Polydor Records singles
Shed Seven songs
Song recordings produced by Chris Sheldon